The Delta Sailplane Honcho and Delta Sailplane Nomad are a family of American ultralight aircraft and motorgliders that were derived from the Volmer VJ-24W SunFun and produced by the Delta Sailplane Corporation. The aircraft were supplied as kits for amateur construction.

Design and development
They feature a strut-braced high-wing, a single-seat, open cockpit, and a single engine in pusher configuration. The Nomad is the motorglider version with monowheel gear and a longer wing, while the Honcho has tricycle landing gear and a shorter wing.

Both the aircraft are made from bolted-together aluminum tubing, with the wings and tail surfaces covered in doped aircraft fabric covering. The high wing is supported by V-struts with jury struts. The pilot sits on an open seat with no windshield. Engines used include the  Lloyd DS1,  Lloyd DS2, and the  Solo 210.

The assembly time is 120–150 hours.

Variants
Honcho
Tricycle landing gear version with nosewheel steering, an auxiliary tailwheel, and a  span wing.
Nomad

Specifications (Honcho)

References

1980s United States ultralight aircraft
1980s United States sailplanes
Homebuilt aircraft
Single-engined pusher aircraft